Indonesia Morning Show was an Indonesian breakfast television on NET. featuring a variety of recent updates, such as hard news, light news, & entertainment news. It broadcasts for 1,5 hours, from 06.00-07.30 WIB.

Segments
Indonesia Morning Show consists of 12 segments and 8 sub-segments:
National News
Politics
Law and Criminal
Business and Finance
Social and Economy
Culture
Education
Infotainment (taken from NET. program Entertainment News)
Sports
Newspaper review
Traffic Report
Weather Report
Music

Culinary with Karen Carlotta
Health
Interactive dialogue
Today's History

External links 
 https://web.archive.org/web/20131112055151/http://www.netmedia.co.id/program/indonesia-morning-show#sthash.EdZjentf.dpuf

Indonesian television news shows
2013 Indonesian television series debuts
2010s Indonesian television series
NET (Indonesian TV network) original programming
Breakfast television